PDSD may refer to the following:

Parallel and Distributed Solutions Division of Intel Corporation
Penn-Delco School District, a public school district in Delaware County, Pennsylvania
Phoenix Day School for the Deaf, a state-run public school in Phoenix, Arizona; see Arizona State Schools for the Deaf and Blind